Sulayman Pasha al-Azm (died August 1743) was the governor of Sidon Eyalet (1727–33), Damascus Eyalet (1733–38, 1741–43), and Egypt Eyalet (1739–40) under the Ottoman Empire. He belonged to the prominent Al-Azm family and was the uncle of As'ad Pasha al-Azm, who succeeded him as governor of Damascus, and Sa'deddin Pasha al-Azm, who also served as governor of Egypt.

Early life
Sulayman Pasha al-Azm was the son of Ibrahim al-'Azm, "a rural notable possibly of Turkish stock", who was sent to Ma'arrat al-Nu'man to restore order in the mid-seventeenth century. Upon his father's death, Sulayman, alongside his brother Ismail Pasha al-Azm,  completed their father's task and were rewarded by the Ottoman administration with hereditary tax farms in Homs, Hama and Ma'arrat al-Nu'man.

Governorship of Damascus
Shortly after gaining the post of wali (governor) of Damascus Eyalet, a bread riot erupted in Damascus city during the winter of 1734. Because of al-Azm's perceived inaction during the riot, local mobs attacked grain storehouses that personally belonged to him. He responded quickly and had four demonstrators hanged, infuriating popular opinion in the city. When he left afterwards to fulfill his duties as  amir al-hajj (commander of the Hajj caravan), "no one [on the caravan] greeted him." Later in 1734–1735, al-Azm improved his reputation by embarking on a campaign of energetic reforms, abolishing unspecified abuses that harmed local artisans. The abundant wheat harvest that spring was critical to his rehabilitation in the eyes of the people of Damascus.

Sulayman commanded the Hajj caravan for the final time beginning in December 1742 and returning to Damascus in April 1743. Later in 1743, another bread riot occurred in Damascus, with hungry mobs attacking the courthouse, driving out the qadi and storming local bakeries. Al-Azm attributed the uprising to the tampering of the food supply by the grain owners, millers, and wholesalers. He issued threats to the above individuals and bread reappeared on the market immediately. In a show of gratitude to al-Azm, "The people prayed for His Excellency [the Governor]." That same year al-Azm sponsored public celebrations upon the occasion of his son's circumcision. He decorated the markets and arranged for seven days and nights of singing, dancing, and other amusements. On the final day of celebrations, he staged a mass circumcision for poor youths and in an act of zakat ("charity"), he showered two gold coins and a new garment on each boy.

Conflict with Zahir al-Umar and death

Beginning in the 1730s, Zahir al-Umar, an Arab sheikh, emerged as a local strongman in the Galilee (administratively part of Sidon Eyalet), which Sulayman Pasha had opposed while he was wali of Sidon between 1728–1730. In the late 1730s, shortly before his dismissal as wali of Damascus, Sulayman Pasha commenced an expedition against Zahir in the latter's headquarters in Tiberias. Sulayman's justification for attacking Zahir was that the latter was an ally of the Bedouin tribes that threatened the safety of the annual Hajj caravan and was a potential obstacle to the collection of taxes in the Galilee. The fortifications of Tiberias prevented the city's fall, but in the fighting outside of its walls, Zahir's brother Salih "Abu Dani" was captured by Sulayman's allies and later hanged in Damascus.

During Sulayman's second term as wali of Damascus, he renewed the campaign against Zahir, who by then expanded his control to Safad, Nazareth, and the western Galilee. On 3 September 1741, Sulayman departed Damascus to subdue Zahir and assembled a coalition of local forces including Druze clans from Mount Lebanon, the clans of Jabal Nablus, Bani Saqr tribesmen, and the district governor of Jerusalem. Sulayman's coalition besieged Tiberias for nearly 90 days, but were unable to capture the city, whose defenses Zahir had significantly reinforced.

Zahir used the time during which Sulayman was away commanding the Hajj caravan to strengthen Tiberias and his minor fortresses such as Deir Hanna and Shefa-'Amr. In July 1743, after addressing internal matters in Damascus, Sulayman launched a third expedition against Zahir with the authorization of Sultan Mahmud I and the backing of the provincial governors of Tripoli and Sidon, and the district governors of Jerusalem, Gaza, Ramla and Irbid in addition to his own troops. Sulayman also had the backing of the Mount Lebanon Druze, but their access to the Galilee was stifled by Zahir's Shia Muslim allies in Jabal Amil. Sulayman decided to change tactics and assault Zahir's lesser Galilee fortresses, from which Tiberias received reinforcements and resupply, to cut Tiberias off from the outside. However, these plans were voided when Sulayman suddenly fell ill and died in the village of Lubya near Tiberias in August. Sulayman's forces were subsequently attacked by Zahir's forces and dispersed.

See also
 Khan Sulayman Pasha
 al-Azm clan
 List of Ottoman governors of Damascus
 List of Ottoman governors of Egypt

References

Bibliography

 
 
 
 

1743 deaths
18th-century Ottoman governors of Egypt
Sulayman
Ottoman governors of Damascus
Ottoman governors of Egypt
Ottoman governors of Sidon
Political people from the Ottoman Empire
Year of birth unknown
Ottoman governors of Tripoli, Lebanon